The Greyest of Blue Skies is the second studio album from the Canadian rock band Finger Eleven. The track "Suffocate" appeared on the Scream 3: The Album soundtrack. The tracks "First Time" and "Drag You Down" each appeared in the Dragonball Z feature film Lord Slug, while the song "Stay and Drown" was in the Dragonball Z feature film Cooler's Revenge. A contestant from Idol 2006 sang "Sick of It All". The album was certified Gold in Canada in June 2001.

Track listing
All songs written by Scott Anderson, James Black and Arnold Lanni, except for where noted.

Personnel
Adapted credits from the booklet.

Finger Eleven
Scott Anderson – vocals
James Black – guitar, vocals
Rick Jackett – guitar
Sean Anderson – bass
Rich Beddoe – drums

Production
Arnold Lanni – producer, mixer
Chris Gauthier – digital editing
Rich Chychi – digital editing
Ted Jensen – mastering

Design
Jeff Faerber – artwork
James Black – art concept

Chart positions

References

2000 albums
Finger Eleven albums
Wind-up Records albums
Albums produced by Arnold Lanni
Nu metal albums by Canadian artists